Meru County is one of the 47 counties of Kenya.  It borders Isiolo County to the north, Tharaka-Nithi County to the east, Nyeri County to the southwest and Laikipia County to the west. The home of the Meru people, Meru County has a population of 1.55 million people.

The county headquarters is in the town of Meru. The current governor of Meru County is Kawira Mwangaza of the Kenya Kwanza coalition.

Physical and topographic features 
Mount Kenya (now politically divided between Meru and other counties) has been greatly influenced by the climate of the coast especially the eastern slopes of the mountain with Altitude ranges from 300m to 5,199m above sea level. Many rivers have theirs streams originating from the mount Kenya and Nyambene streams. Tana and Ewaso Nyiro Rivers are highly depended for domestic and agricultural use.

When Kenya replaced its provinces with counties, Meru County was created out of the Eastern Province. It covers a total area of 7,006 km2 out of which 972.3 km2 is gazetted as forest.

Climatic conditions 
Annual rainfall ranges between 300 mm annually on the lower midlands to 2500 mm in the southeast. Long rains fall from mid-March to May and short rains are present from October to December.

Demographics 
As of the 2019 census, the county has a total population of 987,653 of which 489,691 are males, 497,942 females and 20 intersex persons. There are 244,669 household with an average household size of 4.0 persons per household.

Administrative and political units

Administrative units 
Meru County has nine sub counties, thirty five divisions, one hundred and sixty one locations and three hundred and eighty six sub-locations. It has nine constituencies and forty five county assembly wards.

Sub-counties 

 Buuri East
 Buuri West
 Igembe North
 Igembe South
 Igembe Central
 Imenti North
 Imenti South
 Imenti Central
 Tigania East
 Tigania West

Constituencies 

 Buuri
 Igembe North
 Igembe Central
 Igembe South
 North Imenti
 South Imenti
 Central Imenti
 Tigania East
 Tigania West

Political leadership 
The first governor of Meru County was Peter Munya, elected in the 2013 election. In the 2017 election, Kiraitu Murungi defeated Munya to become the second governor. The third and current governor, Kawira Mwangaza, was elected in the 2022 election.

Murungi was elected in 2013 to be the senator from Meru County. When he ran for governor, Franklin Linturi was elected to the Senate.

Florence Kajuju was the county's first woman representative. She was defeated in 2017 by Kawira Mwangaza.

The Meru County Executive Committee comprises:

Source

Education 
There are 1,437 ECD centres, 1,030 primary schools and 372 secondary schools. The county has also 7 tertiary institutions, 6 special schools 7,483 adult education centres and 7 university campuses. Meru University of Science and Technology and Meru National Polytechnic are the largest education centers in Meru County.

Health 
There is a total of 460 health facilities, 995 hospital beds and 73 cots in the county, staffed by 1325 health personnel.

HIV prevalence rate was 2.9% in 2017, lower than the national rate of 5.9%.

Transport 
The county is covered by 1,260 km of road network. Of this, 767.5 km is covered by earth surface, 266.7 km is marram surface and 225.7 km of surface is covered by bitumen. During the rainy seasons, some sections of gravel and earth surface roads are impassable. 

The county is served by one airstrip; Gaitu airstrip in Meru Central.

Posts and telecommunications 
There are six post offices and four sub-post offices with 7,600 installed letter boxes, 5,937 rented letter boxes, and 1,663 vacant letter boxes with numerous registered stamp vendors in the county. The six post offices are located in Meru, Maua, Nkubu, Timau, Muthara and Laare. They offer mail services, parcel delivery and other services. Most private and public organizations have embraced ICT in the day-to-day operations. Private entrepreneurs have continued to set up cyber cafes in major towns and trading centers due to high demand for internet services among others. Most of the areas in the county are covered by mobile phone network with the coverage being 95 percent. Areas without mobile network coverage are mainly areas of Tigania bordering Isiolo County. Most of the community members rely on radio, television and newspapers as the major sources of information.

History
In 1992, Meru District was split into Meru Central District, Meru North District, Meru South District, and Tharaka District In 1998, Tharaka District was again split into Nithi District and Tharaka District. A High Court decision in September 2009 ruled that the split had been unconstitutional, and the first two of these were re-amalgamated into Meru District, which became Meru County in 2010.

Population

Villages and settlements 
 Ardencaple Farm
 Magado
Nkubu
Inghi Farm

References

External links
Office for the Coordination of Humanitarian Affairs – Kenya AdminLevels 1-4
view of Lake Michealson

 
Counties of Kenya
Eastern Province (Kenya)